Geinitzina is a genus of Foraminifera (Protista  or Protozoa) from the early Carboniferous (late Mississippian to the late Permian that may have extended into the Triassic. Chambers are uniserial, arranged in a single row, or line. Test wall is double layered. The outer layer is of hyaline radial calcite, and is light in color. The inner layer is of microgranular calcite, and is dark is color. Both layers are secreted by the protoplasm.

Geinitzina is included in the Fusulinida (Loeblich & Tappan, 1984, 1988) on the basis of test wall composition, in having a secreted microgranular layer.

References

Further reading
 A. R. Loeblich and H. Tappan. 1984. Suprageneric classification of the Foraminiferida (Protozoa). Micropaleontology 30(1):1-70 
 __ __ 1988.* Forminiferal Genera and their Classification. E-book 
Geinitzina in The Paleobiology Database.
 

Prehistoric Foraminifera genera
Mississippian first appearances
Lopingian genus extinctions